The Karatsuba algorithm is a fast multiplication algorithm. It was discovered by Anatoly Karatsuba in 1960 and published in 1962. It is therefore asymptotically faster than the traditional algorithm, which performs  single-digit products. For example, to multiply two 1024-digit numbers (n = 1024 = 210), the traditional algorithm requires (210)2 = 1,048,576 single-digit multiplications, whereas the Karatsuba algorithm requires 310 = 59,049 thus being ~17.758 times faster.

The Karatsuba algorithm was the first multiplication algorithm asymptotically faster than the quadratic "grade school" algorithm.
The Toom–Cook algorithm (1963) is a faster generalization of Karatsuba's method, and the Schönhage–Strassen algorithm (1971) is even faster, for sufficiently large n.

History
Andrey Kolmogorov conjectured that the traditional algorithm was asymptotically optimal, meaning that any algorithm for that task would require  elementary operations.

In 1960, Kolmogorov organized a seminar on mathematical problems in cybernetics at the Moscow State University, where he stated the  conjecture and other problems in the complexity of computation. Within a week, Karatsuba, then a 23-year-old student, found an algorithm that multiplies two n-digit numbers in  elementary steps, thus disproving the conjecture. Kolmogorov was very excited about the discovery; he communicated it at the next meeting of the seminar, which was then terminated. Kolmogorov gave some lectures on the Karatsuba result at conferences all over the world (see, for example, "Proceedings of the International Congress of Mathematicians 1962", pp. 351–356, and also "6 Lectures delivered at the International Congress of Mathematicians in Stockholm, 1962") and published the method in 1962, in the Proceedings of the USSR Academy of Sciences. The article had been written by Kolmogorov and contained two results on multiplication, Karatsuba's algorithm and a separate result by Yuri Ofman; it listed "A. Karatsuba and Yu. Ofman" as the authors. Karatsuba only became aware of the paper when he received the reprints from the publisher.

Algorithm

Basic step
This basic step is, in fact, a generalization of a similar complex multiplication algorithm, where the imaginary unit  is replaced by a power of the base.

Let  and  be represented as -digit strings in some base .

The product is then

where

These formulae require four multiplications and were known to Charles Babbage. Karatsuba observed that  can be computed in only three multiplications, at the cost of a few extra additions.

Example
To compute the product of 12345 and 6789, where B = 10, choose m = 3. We use m right shifts for decomposing the input operands using the resulting base (Bm = 1000), as:
 12345 = 12 · 1000 + 345
  6789 =  6 · 1000 + 789

Only three multiplications, which operate on smaller integers, are used to compute three partial results:
 z2 = 12 × 6 = 72
 z0 = 345 × 789 = 272205
 z1 = (12 + 345) × (6 + 789) − z2 − z0 = 357 × 795 − 72 − 272205 = 283815 − 72 − 272205 = 11538

We get the result by just adding these three partial results, shifted accordingly (and then taking carries into account by decomposing these three inputs in base 1000 like for the input operands):
 result = z2 · (Bm)2 + z1 · (Bm)1 + z0 · (Bm)0, i.e.
 result = 72 · 10002 + 11538 · 1000 + 272205 = 83810205.

Note that the intermediate third multiplication operates on an input domain which is less than two times larger than for the two first multiplications, its output domain is less than four times larger, and base-1000 carries computed from the first two multiplications must be taken into account when computing these two subtractions.

Recursive application
If n is four or more, the three multiplications in Karatsuba's basic step involve operands with fewer than n digits. Therefore, those products can be computed by recursive calls of the Karatsuba algorithm. The recursion can be applied until the numbers are so small that they can (or must) be computed directly.

In a computer with a full 32-bit by 32-bit multiplier, for example, one could choose B = 231 and store each digit as a separate 32-bit binary word. Then the sums x1 + x0 and y1 + y0 will not need an extra binary word for storing the carry-over digit (as in carry-save adder), and the Karatsuba recursion can be applied until the numbers to multiply are only one digit long.

Time complexity analysis
Karatsuba's basic step works for any base B and any m, but the recursive algorithm is most efficient when m is equal to n/2, rounded up. In particular, if n is 2k, for some integer k, and the recursion stops only when n is 1, then the number of single-digit multiplications is 3k, which is nc where c = log23.

Since one can extend any inputs with zero digits until their length is a power of two, it follows that the number of elementary multiplications, for any n, is at most .

Since the additions, subtractions, and digit shifts (multiplications by powers of B) in Karatsuba's basic step take time proportional to n, their cost becomes negligible as n increases. More precisely, if t(n) denotes the total number of elementary operations that the algorithm performs when multiplying two n-digit numbers, then

for some constants c and d. For this recurrence relation, the master theorem for divide-and-conquer recurrences gives the asymptotic bound .

It follows that, for sufficiently large n, Karatsuba's algorithm will perform fewer shifts and single-digit additions than longhand multiplication, even though its basic step uses more additions and shifts than the straightforward formula. For small values of n, however, the extra shift and add operations may make it run slower than the longhand method. The point of positive return depends on the computer platform and context. As a rule of thumb, Karatsuba's method is usually faster when the multiplicands are longer than 320–640 bits.

Implementation

Here is the pseudocode for this algorithm, using numbers represented in base ten. For the binary representation of integers, it suffices to replace everywhere 10 by 2.

The second argument of the split_at function specifies the number of digits to extract from the right: for example, split_at("12345", 3) will extract the 3 final digits, giving: high="12", low="345".

function karatsuba(num1, num2)
    if (num1 < 10 or num2 < 10)
        return num1 × num2 /* fall back to traditional multiplication */
    
    /* Calculates the size of the numbers. */
    m = max(size_base10(num1), size_base10(num2))
    m2 = floor(m / 2) 
    /* m2 = ceil (m / 2) will also work */
    
    /* Split the digit sequences in the middle. */
    high1, low1 = split_at(num1, m2)
    high2, low2 = split_at(num2, m2)
    
    /* 3 recursive calls made to numbers approximately half the size. */
    z0 = karatsuba(low1, low2)
    z1 = karatsuba(low1 + high1, low2 + high2)
    z2 = karatsuba(high1, high2)
    
    return (z2 × 10 ^ (m2 × 2)) + ((z1 - z2 - z0) × 10 ^ m2) + z0

This can be avoided by noting that

This method may produce negative numbers, which require one extra bit to encode signedness, and would still require one extra bit for the multiplier. Another advantage is that even though  may be negative, the final computation of  only involves additions.

References

External links
 Karatsuba's Algorithm for Polynomial Multiplication

 Bernstein, D. J., "Multidigit multiplication for mathematicians". Covers Karatsuba and many other multiplication algorithms.

Computer arithmetic algorithms
Multiplication
Articles with example pseudocode
Divide-and-conquer algorithms